Kadina High Campus, part of The Rivers Secondary College, is a government-funded co-educational comprehensive secondary day school campus, located in Goonellabah, a suburb of Lismore, in the Northern Rivers region of New South Wales, Australia. 

Established in 1976 as Kadina High School, the campus enrolled approximately 440 students in 2018, from Year 7 to Year 12, of whom 16 percent identified as Indigenous Australians and five percent were from a language background other than English. The school is operated by the NSW Department of Education; the principal is James Witchard.

The Rivers Secondary College comprises the Richmond River High Campus, the Kadina High Campus, and the Lismore High Campus.

House system
Students are divided alphabetically into four house groups. School carnivals in swimming, athletics and cross country are organised on a house basis. There are also sport captains in each sport house that lead the houses into house and school spirit chants and organise house meetings and do various jobs.  The houses are:

Notable alumni 

 Craig Fosterformer soccer player and sports journalist; human rights and refugee ambassador
 Paul Fosterformer soccer player
 Adam Gilchrist former cricket player; captained Australia; now sports journalist
 Adam Hughesformer soccer player
 Ngaire Josephsinger-songwriter
 David Meadrugby league football player
 Taya Smith-Gaukrodgersinger/worship leader for Hillsong United
 Emma Tomauthor and journalist
 Darren Williamsauthor
Jake Collins - Actor, Entrepreneur and Journalist
Craig Price - 2nd Place in 2014 Speak Off

See also

 List of government schools in New South Wales
 Education in Australia

References

External links
 
 NSW Schools website

Educational institutions established in 1976
Public high schools in New South Wales
1976 establishments in Australia
Northern Rivers